Haftvan or Haftavan or Haftovan may refer to:

 Haftvan, West Azerbaijan
 Haftvaneh